Elizabeth Couper-Kuhlen (born 1943) is an American linguist and distinguished professor (emeritus) from the University of Helsinki.

Couper-Kuhlen is regarded as an important figure in the development of interactional linguistics and the study of prosody in conversation, through a number of books co-edited with Margret Selting: the 1996 book Prosody in Conversation, the 2001 book Studies in Interactional Linguistics also co-edited with Selting, and the textbook Interactional Linguistics. Her book Building Responsive Action written together with Barbara Fox and Sandra Thompson received the best book award from the International Society for Conversation Analysis in 2018.

Couper-Kuhlen is member of the editorial board of Research on Language and Social Interaction and has received a honorary doctorate from the University of Helsinki. For her 65th birthday, a conference and following book publication was dedicated to her.

Biography
Elizabeth Couper-Kuhlen received a doctoral degree in 1977 on the basis of her thesis The Prepositional Passive in English, published in 1979, and had been and was then a lecturer in different places in Germany. In 1991, she did her habilitation with the thesis  English Speech Rhythm, published in 1993, and became professor of English linguistics at the University of Konstanz in 1995. In 2003, she moved to the University of Potsdam for another professorship, until she became Finland Distinguished Professor at the University of Helsinki in 2009 and director for the Center of Excellence for Research on Intersubjectivity in Interaction in 2013. She is now retired.

Selected publications

References

Living people
1943 births
Linguists of English
Phoneticians
Linguists from the United States
Women linguists
Academic staff of the University of Helsinki